The following lists events that happened in 2014 in Papua New Guinea.

Incumbents
Monarch: Elizabeth II
Governor-General: Michael Ogio
Prime Minister: Peter O'Neill

Provincial Governors
Central: Kila Haoda
Chimbu: Noah Kool
East New Britain: Ereman Tobaining Jr.
East Sepik: Michael Somare
Enga: Peter Ipatas
Gulf: Havila Kavo
Hela: Anderson Agiru
Jikawa: William Tongamp
Madang: Jim Kas
Manus: Charlie Benjamin
Milne Bay: Titus Philemon
Morobe: Kelly Naru
New Ireland: Julius Chan
Oro: Gary Juffa
Sandaun: Vacant
Southern Highlands: William Powl
West New Britain: Sasindran Muthuvel
Western: Ati Wobiro
Western Highlands: Paias Wingti

Events

January
 January 18 – A warrant is issued for the arrest of Leader of the Opposition Belden Namah over claims that he sent a threatening letter to the commissioner of police.

December
 December 1 – A group of 30 armed men raid Lae Nadzab Airport holding passengers hostage and ransack offices.

References

 
Papua New Guinea
Years of the 21st century in Papua New Guinea
Papua New Guinea
2010s in Papua New Guinea